Wysogotówek  is a village in the administrative district of Gmina Kotlin, within Jarocin County, Greater Poland Voivodeship, in west-central Poland.
The German name for this town was Weißkotten during the Third Reich occupation and presumably under the Kingdom of Prussia during most of the 19th century.

References

Villages in Jarocin County